The JW Marriott Cannes is a five star hotel on the Croisette in Cannes. It was built in 1992 as the Noga Hilton by hotel magnate Nessim Gaon, and was renamed the Palais Stéphanie in 2007 when it passed from Hilton to Accor. It was renamed again in 2011, becoming a JW Marriott. It is located between the Carlton, Le Martinez and Le Majestic. In 1993, Steelman Partners designed the casino located in the hotel. The casino was known as Casino Riviera.

External links

Buildings and structures in Cannes
Hotels in Cannes
Cannes
Hotels established in 1992
Hotel buildings completed in 1992